Dušan Flipović (12 December 1952 – 14 February 2007) was a Yugoslav sprint canoer who competed in the early 1970s. At the 1972 Summer Olympics in Munich, he was eliminated in the semifinals of the K-4 1000 m event.

References
Dušan Flipović's profile at Sports Reference.com
Biography of Dušan Flipović 

1952 births
2007 deaths
Canoeists at the 1972 Summer Olympics
Olympic canoeists of Yugoslavia
Yugoslav male canoeists
Place of birth missing